Kruszewo may refer to the following places:
Kruszewo, Żuromin County in Masovian Voivodeship (east-central Poland)
Kruszewo, Ostrołęka County in Masovian Voivodeship (east-central Poland)
Kruszewo, Podlaskie Voivodeship (north-east Poland)
Kruszewo, Greater Poland Voivodeship (west-central Poland)
Kruszewo, Warmian-Masurian Voivodeship (north Poland)